Helicopter Girl (born 1969) is the stage name of Jackie Joyce, a musician from Dundee, Scotland. She was born to a Scottish mother and Ghanaian father. She was previously a member of the groups Mouth Music and Ambisonic.

Music career
Her first album was 2000's How to Steal the World, which was nominated for a Mercury Prize. Also, in 2001, she appeared on the Rod Stewart album, Human, performing with him on the track "Don't Come Around Here."

Joyce then took an extended break from the business before writing and recording her second album, Voodoo Chic, which featured the single "Angel City," and was released in 2004.  The album Metropolitan was released in June 2008.  It was preceded by the single "It Doesn't Get Much Better Than This".

Helicopter Girl's fourth album, Wanda Meant, was self-released on 1 April 2015.

A track in the album Ecohero by Ambisonic, a band she was a member of in 1997, featured a song called "Helicopter Kinda Girl" which is where she got her stage name from.

Discography

Albums
How to Steal the World (Instant Karma Records, 2000)
Voodoo Chic (Dharma Records, 2004; (released in 2005 in the United States on Robbins Entertainment)
Metropolitan (Dharma Records, 2008)
Wanda Meant (Helicopter Girl Music, 2015)

Singles
"345 Wonderful" (2000)
"Subliminal Punk" (2001)
"Glove Compartment" (2001)
"Angel City" (2004) #82 UK
"White Revolving Circles" (2004)
"Umbrellas in the Rain" (2005)
"It Doesn't Get Much Better Than This" (2008)
"Ballerina" (2008)
"It's Coming Up" (2015)

References

External links
Article from The Guardian, 2004
Instant Karma on the web
Entry in Encyclopedia of Popular Music (4 ed.), 2006

1969 births
21st-century Scottish women singers
British indie pop musicians
British trip hop musicians
British women in electronic music
Black British musicians
Downtempo musicians
Living people
Scottish contraltos
Scottish electronic musicians
Scottish experimental musicians
Scottish folk singers
Scottish people of Ghanaian descent
Scottish singer-songwriters
Scottish soul singers
Trip hop musicians
Women in electronic music